The University of Abra (UAbra), formerly Abra State Institute of Sciences and Technology (ASIST) is a public university in Abra, Philippines. Its main campus is located in Lagangilang and has a satellite campus in the capital town of Bangued.

ASIST was converted to university status by decree of Republic Act 11574 or the "University of Abra Law" which was approved on July 23, 2021.

References

External links
 

Universities and colleges in Abra (province)
State universities and colleges in the Philippines
Philippine Association of State Universities and Colleges